Cyperus forskalianus is a species of sedge that is native to Yemen.

See also 
 List of Cyperus species

References 

forskalianus
Plants described in 2005
Flora of Yemen